Lisa O'Neill (born 8 August 1968 is a retired professional tennis player from Australia.

ITF finals

Singles (1–2)

Doubles (3–0)

References

External links
 
 

1968 births
Living people
Australian female tennis players
Wimbledon junior champions
Grand Slam (tennis) champions in girls' doubles
Place of birth missing (living people)